German submarine U-1 was the first U-boat (or submarine) built for Nazi Germany's Kriegsmarine following Adolf Hitler's abrogation of the terms of the Treaty of Versailles in 1935, which banned Germany possessing a submarine force.

A Type IIA U-boat, she was built at the Deutsche Werke shipyards in Kiel, yard number 236, her keel being laid on 11 February 1935 amid celebration. She was commissioned on 29 June 1935 after a very rapid construction, and was manned by crews trained in the Netherlands.

Design
U-1 had a displacement of  when at the surface and  while submerged. She had two shafts and two  propellers.

U-1 was fitted with three  torpedo tubes at the bow, five torpedoes or up to twelve Type A torpedo mines, and a  anti-aircraft gun. The boat had a complement of 25.

Service history
Her pre-war service was unremarkable, but she did gain a reputation as a poor ship. Her rapid construction, combined with the inadequacy of the technology which was used to create her, made her uncomfortable, leaky and slow. When war came, there were already plans to shelve her and her immediate sister boats for use as training boats only.

Despite this however, owing to a shortage of available units she sailed on 29 March 1940 against British shipping operating off Norway, close to the limit of her effective operating range. She failed to find a target, but was sent out again on 4 April, in preparation for Operation Weserübung (the invasion of Norway).

Fate
U-1 sent a brief radio signal on 6 April, giving her position, before she disappeared. She was struck by a mine in British minefield Field No. 7 in the North Sea north of Terschelling at position . The entire aft section of the boat was blown off and all hands lost. In June 2007, the wreck of U-1 was located by divers.

She was the first of over 1,000 U-boats to serve during the Battle of the Atlantic, and one of over 700 to be lost at sea.

References

Bibliography

External links

German Type II submarines
U-boats commissioned in 1935
World War II submarines of Germany
U-boats sunk in 1940
1935 ships
Ships built in Kiel
U-boats sunk by mines
Maritime incidents in April 1940